Côte d'Or Football Club, is a football club based in Praslin, Seychelles. It currently plays in Seychelles League. In 2013, the club has won the Seychelles League.

Stadium
Currently the team plays at the 2,000 capacity Stade d’Amitié.

Crest

Achievements
Seychelles League: 3
 2013, 2016, 2018

Performance in CAF competitions
CAF Champions League: 2 appearances
2014 – Preliminary Round 
2017 – Preliminary Round

CAF Confederation Cup: 1 appearance
2015 – Preliminary Round

References

External links
Soccerway

Football clubs in Seychelles